Jamie Murray and John Peers were the defending champions, but Murray chose to compete in Doha instead. Peers played alongside Henri Kontinen and successfully defended his title, defeating James Duckworth and Chris Guccione in the final, 7–6(7–4), 6–1.

Seeds

Draw

Draw

References 
Main Draw

Brisbane International Doubles
Mn's Doubles